Henry Christopher Wise (7 October 1806 – 15 January 1883) was an English Conservative politician who sat in the House of Commons from 1865 to 1874.

Wise was the son of Rev. Henry Wise of the Priory, Warwick and his wife Charlotte Mary Porten, daughter of Sir Stanier Porten. He was educated at Rugby School and at Oriel College, Oxford. He was Deputy Lieutenant and Justice of the Peace for Warwickshire and a major in the Warwickshire Yeomanry Cavalry.
 
At the 1865 general election Wise was elected as a Member of Parliament (MP) for South Warwickshire. He held the seat until 1874.

Wise died at the age of 76.

Wise married firstly in 1828, Harriett Skipwith, daughter of Sir Gray Skipwith, 8th Baronet. She died in 1858 and he married secondly Jane Harriet Disbrowe, daughter of Sir Edward Cromwell Disbrowe, G.C.G.

References

External links

1806 births
1883 deaths
Conservative Party (UK) MPs for English constituencies
UK MPs 1865–1868
UK MPs 1868–1874
People educated at Rugby School
Alumni of Oriel College, Oxford
Deputy Lieutenants of Warwickshire